Harry Savage (1 July 1887 – 14 November 1964) was an Australian cricketer. He played one first-class match for New South Wales in 1921/22.

See also
 List of New South Wales representative cricketers

References

External links
 

1887 births
1964 deaths
Australian cricketers
New South Wales cricketers
Cricketers from Sydney